BMO USA, formerly known as BMO Harris Bank(), is an American bank based in Chicago, Illinois. It is an independent subsidiary of the multinational investment bank and financial services company Bank of Montreal, which owns BMO USA through the holding company BMO Financial Corporation (formerly Bankmont Financial Corporation, then Harris Financial Corporation). BMO USA is a member of the Federal Reserve System and one of the largest banks in the United States. It has over 1,100 branches and roughly 2,300 ATMs and employs 23,800 staff across the states of Illinois, Indiana, Arizona, Missouri, Minnesota, Kansas, Florida, Wisconsin, and California.

Harris Bank traces its history to 1882 in Chicago, and became an acquired subsidiary of Bank of Montreal in 1984. BMO has since increased its presence in the U.S. through a series of acquisitions of other banks, such as Suburban Bancorp in 1994, Marshall & Ilsley in 2011, and Bank of the West in 2023. In September 2022, BMO announced plans to rebrand from "BMO Harris Bank," as it had been known since 2011, to "BMO."

History

In 1882, Norman Wait Harris established N.W. Harris & Co., a Chicago-based municipal bond broker and the forerunner of Harris Bank.  Harris Trust and Savings Bank was established 1907.  It merged with Chicago National Bank in 1960 and was restructured as Harris Bank, N.A. in 1972. Bank of Montreal (later known as BMO Financial Group) acquired Harris in 1984.

The bank grew rapidly through a series of acquisitions beginning with the First National Bank of Barrington in 1985, State Bank of St. Charles and First National Bank of Batavia in 1988 and Libertyville Federal Savings Bank and Loan and Frankfort Bancshares in 1990.  Harris Bankcorp and Suburban Bancorp combined under the Harris name in 1994 and two years later, the company acquired 54 Chicago area branches from Household Bank.  In 1999, the direct brokerage firm Burke, Christensen & Lewis merged with Harris Investors Direct to form Harris InvestorLine.  The company's further acquisitions include Freeman Welwood in 2000; Village Bank of Naples, and Century Bank (Arizona) and First National Bank of Joliet in 2001; Northwestern Trust and Investors Advisory Company (Seattle) in 2002.  Also in 2002, InvestorLine combined with CSFBdirect to form Harrisdirect and Harris acquired online client accounts of Morgan Stanley Individual Investor Group and myCFO.  The following year, it purchased Sullivan, Bruyette Speros & Blayney Incorporated, followed by Lakeland Community Bank in Round Lake, and Villa Park Trust and Savings Bank in 2005.

BMO continued its acquisitions in 2007 with First National Bank & Trust, (Kokomo, Indiana) followed by Ozaukee Bank, (Cedarburg, Wisconsin) and Merchant and Manufacturers Bankcorp Inc., (New Berlin, Wisconsin) in 2008 and Amcore Bank N.A. (Rockford, Illinois) on April 23, 2010.

On December 17, 2010, Bank of Montreal agreed to purchase Milwaukee-based Marshall & Ilsley Corporation in an all-stock transaction valued at about US$4.1 billion. Marshall & Ilsley and Harris Bankcorp were both rebranded as BMO Harris. The company restructured as BMO Bankcorp July 5, 2011.

In December 2015, the company completed its acquisition of General Electric Capital Corp.'s transportation finance business.

BMO was the bank with the second-most deposits in Chicago by June 2018, with 11.5% market share. Also that month, its BMO Harris division was operating in eight states in the US.

In December 2021, Bank of Montreal agreed to purchase Bank of the West with the intent on merging it with BMO Harris Bank, which would at least double its U.S. presence. The acquisition of Bank of the West was completed in February 2023, and the Bank of the West brand is planned to be absorbed into the global BMO brand by September 2023. Coinciding with this merger, BMO Harris Bank announced that it will retire the combined "BMO Harris" brand and will also start to primarily do business under the global BMO brand of its Canadian parent company.

Operations
BMO is one of the largest banks in the Midwest with over 600 branches and approximately 1,300 ATMs in Illinois, Wisconsin, Indiana, Kansas, Missouri, Minnesota, Arizona, Florida and California.  It is the second-largest Chicago-area bank based on market share, behind JPMorgan Chase, and the second largest US subsidiary of a Canadian bank after TD Bank, N.A. (owned by the Toronto-Dominion Bank). BMO is the issuer of the Diners Club cards in United States.

Headquarters
BMO is headquartered in a complex of three buildings in Chicago's Loop neighborhood.  The original 21-story building was constructed in 1910 at 119 West Monroe Street.  The entrance to the building is flanked by two bas-relief sculptures of lions, which inspired various iterations of the bank's logo until 2011, along with the bank's mascot character, Hubert the Lion.  In 1960, a 23-story structure was added to the east with the address of 111 West Monroe.  In 1974, a second 38-story tower was added to the west with the address of 115 South LaSalle Street.  Both additions were designed by the firm of Skidmore, Owings and Merrill and are in the modern style.  The bank uses the address of the 1960 building.  In December 2018, the bank announced it would move its headquarters to 14 floors of a 50-story office tower adjacent to Chicago Union Station. The bank expects the new BMO Tower to be ready in 2022.

Additionally, notable BMO buildings are located in Milwaukee (BMO Harris Financial Center), at 770 North Water Street, and Indianapolis (BMO Plaza). In 2017, the bank began construction of a 25-story BMO Tower at North Water and East Wells, adjacent to its current Milwaukee headquarters. The bank expects to occupy  of the building beginning in December 2019.  In August 2017, BMO sold the 20-story structure it currently occupies to real estate firm Irgens, which plans to remodel and lease it.

Naming rights and sponsorships
BMO owns corporate naming rights to the following:

 BMO Center in Rockford, Illinois
 BMO Harris Pavilion at Summerfest in Milwaukee – Official Sponsor of Summerfest.

BMO Harris Bank is a sponsor of:

 Chicago Blackhawks – Official bank of the Chicago Blackhawks.
 Chicago Bulls – Official bank of the Chicago Bulls.
 Chicago White Sox – Official partner of the Chicago White Sox.
 Milwaukee Bucks – Official bank of the Milwaukee Bucks.
 Minnesota Wild – Official partner of the Minnesota Wild.
 Rockford IceHogs of the AHL, the Chicago Blackhawks affiliate – Official bank of the Rockford IceHogs.
 Wisconsin Badgers Athletics – Official partner of the UW-Madison Badgers.

See also

Harris, Hall & Co., securities affiliate established in 1934, following passage of the Glass Steagall Act and acquired by Dean Witter & Co. in 1953
Harris, Forbes & Co., securities affiliate established in 1911 and acquired by Chase Manhattan Bank in 1930

References

External links

Banks based in Illinois
Harris Bank
Banks based in Chicago
American subsidiaries of foreign companies
Banks established in 1882
1882 establishments in Illinois
1984 mergers and acquisitions